Benedictine or benedictine spread is a spread made with cucumbers and cream cheese. Invented near the beginning of the 20th century, it was originally and still is used for making cucumber sandwiches, but in recent years it has been used as a dip or combined with meat in a sandwich. This spread can be obtained pre-made from some Louisville, Kentucky-area grocery stores.

Although benedictine is rarely seen in restaurants outside the state of Kentucky, it has been written about in articles in national publications such as The New York Times, The Washington Post, and Saveur Magazine, and also reported about on multimedia outlets such as the Food Network and NPR.

A benedictine-based sandwich was featured on the Food Network's 50 States 50 Sandwiches program in 2012, on the television shows of celebrity chefs Paula Deen and Damaris Phillips, in Southern Living magazine as one of June's "2011 Best Recipes" for their corresponding issue, in Garden & Gun magazine, and in PopSugar.

History
Benedictine was invented near the beginning of the 20th century by Jennie Carter Benedict, a caterer, restaurateur and cookbook author in Louisville, Kentucky. Benedict opened a kitchen for providing catering services in 1893, and in 1900 opened a restaurant and tea room called Benedict's.  It was probably during her catering period when she invented and originally served benedictine.

Benedict's cookbooks are still being sold a century after they were first published. For example, her The Blue Ribbon Cook Book, which first published in 1902, has been reprinted numerous times and most recently in 2008.  Although early editions of this book do not contain a recipe for the spread, the most recent edition does.

Recipe
Following are the original benedictine recipe ingredients used by Benedict, as reported by the Louisville Courier-Journal and NPR:
8 oz. cream cheese, softened
3 tbsps. cucumber juice
1 tbsp. onion juice
1 tsp. salt
A few grains of cayenne pepper
2 drops green food coloring

The original spread is made by thoroughly blending all these ingredients with a fork.

Modern variants of the recipe use grated or chopped cucumber and onions rather than juice, as well as dill and common spread ingredients. They also use significantly less salt.

See also

 Pimento cheese
 Tzatziki
 Cuisine of Kentucky
 History of Louisville, Kentucky
 List of common dips
 List of sandwiches

References

Spreads (food)
American condiments
Kentucky cuisine
Cuisine of Louisville, Kentucky
History of Louisville, Kentucky
Food and drink introduced in the 1890s
1890s establishments in Kentucky